Pycnarmon juanalis is a moth in the family Crambidae. It is found in Brazil (São Paulo).

References

Moths described in 1933
Spilomelinae
Moths of South America
Taxa named by William Schaus